is a registered trademark of the Japanese toilet company TOTO and is used for their line of cleansing toilet seats with water spray feature for genital and anal cleansing. The Washlet is an electronic bidet and commonplace on toilets in Japan. Released in June 1980, a total of more than 30 million Washlets had been sold by January 2011.

History

Toto's business model in the 1960s was to import American “wash air seats” for domestic sales. They were mainly sold to hospitals for medical purposes and nursing homes. Toto began domestic production in 1969, but wash air seats were initially expensive and sometimes caused scalding injuries because of poor regulation of water temperature. 

Toto continued its own research and development, surveying 300 male and female employees to determine the appropriate spray positions, because there were no biometric statistics available.

Banking on the prospect that washlets would widely sell in Japan, Toto began to sell its own improved washlets in 1980. The two models were the G series ("Gorgeous") that could store warm water, had a bidet and a dryer function, and toilet seat warming (the function of which is called "warmlet"); and the S series ("Standard)" that instantly turned cold water into warm water and was equipped with a bidet and a warmlet function. The two series have remained the basic product models until now, along with a compact series introduced in 1993. The models initially included a regular size and an elongated size, depending on the configuration of the toilet to which washlets were attached, but were replaced by single-sized models in February 2012 with a few exceptions such as products for hotel usage.

Recognizing its pioneering role, in 2012, the initial model Washlet G was certified as item number 55 of Mechanical Engineering Heritage.

In a 1982 commercial that featured then-rising pop singer Jun Togawa, the advertising slogan “Our butt wants to be washed too” and unique background music quickly drew public attention to Toto's new product. As the commercial was originally aired during the 7–10 pm slot, known as "golden time", it received complaints from viewers about the impropriety of advertising toilet seats during mealtime, and criticism for using the word "butt".

Toto introduced a sensor that detects whether the user is seated or not, throughout the product lineup (earlier washlets activated regardless of whether the user was seated or not). The company added new functions including toilet lids that automatically open and close, toilet cleansing, deodorant, gas absorbent, and air refresher. Complete toilets with built-in washlets were introduced (“Neo-rest” and “GG”) and Toto's product lineup of washlets designed for public facilities, business offices, and hotels was strengthened.

Toto made other improvements such as incorporating "sleep mode" for energy conservation, and a remote control which can be attached to a wall. In October 2005, Toto released washlets that can play MP3 audio files. Upon her visit to Japan in 2005, pop singer Madonna commented that she had "missed Japan’s warm toilet seats".

Toto also released washlets designed for Japanese-style squat toilets in 1996, but they proved less easy to use due to problems with accuracy. As more and more Japanese-style toilets were replaced by western-style toilets, the model was discontinued around 2003. On the other hand, portable types for travelers are still in production.

Functions

The buttons associated with operating the cleansing features are labeled Oshiri ("Rear") and "Bidet" ("Front" in English speaking regions). Most current models have a sensor that prevents spraying water when a person is not sitting on the toilet.

For antibacterial and antifouling purposes, the nozzle is designed at such an angle that the water does not splash back on the inside of the toilet (43º for anuses, 53º for vulvas), and the nozzle itself is washed with warm water when it is stowed away or before use. Anal and genital cleansing functions operate on different nozzles. Some models feature deodorizers and dryers for the user's convenience.

See also
Electronic bidet
Toilets in Japan

References

External links 
 Official link
 Drake II specifications on TOTO official website
 Washlet - TotoUSA.com.html

Toilets
Japanese inventions